Jantar Mantar is an equinoctial sundial, consisting a gigantic triangular gnomon with the hypotenuse parallel to the Earth's axis. Jantar Mantar may also refer to;

Observatory
Jantar Mantar
Jantar Mantar, Jaipur, houses world's largest stone sundial, a UNESCO World Heritage site
Jantar Mantar, New Delhi, it consists of 13 architectural astronomy instruments
Jantar Mantar, Varanasi, observatory built in the year 1737
Ved Shala, observatory built in the year 1725

Film
Jantar Mantar (1964 film), Hindi film released in 1964

Public art
Jantar-Mantar, public art work by sculptor Narendra Patel, located on the campus of the University of Wisconsin–Milwaukee